Pablo Aguilar may refer to:
 Pablo Aguilar (footballer, born 1984), Argentine footballer
 Pablo Aguilar (footballer, born 1995), Guatemalan footballer
 Pablo Aguilar (footballer, born 1987), Paraguayan footballer
 Pablo Aguilar (basketball) (born 1989), Spanish professional basketball player